KIR2DL3, Killer cell immunoglobulin-like receptor 2DL3 is a transmembrane glycoprotein expressed by the natural killer cells and the subsets of the T cells. The KIR genes are polymorphic, which means that they have many different alleles. The KIR genes are also extremely homologous, which means that they are similar in position, structure and evolutionary origin, but not necessarily in function.

Natural killer (NK) cells are an important component of innate antiviral immune response. Have the ability to lyse target cells without prior sensitization antigen and regulate the immune responses by secreting chemokine adaptive and cytokines. Activation of NK cells is determined by integration of inhibitory signals and activating issued by several families of different receptors, including killer cell immunoglobulin-like receptors (KIR) that predominantly recognize antigens of class I human leukocyte antigen ( HLA).

Structure and location 
The genes responsible for coding of KIR proteins are found along the 19th chromosome section 19q 13.4 within the 1Mb Leukocyte Receptor Complex (LRC). The subsets of the KIR proteins are classified by their number of extracellular IG domains and by whether they have a long (L) or short (S) cytoplasmic domain-tail. The number coming at the end of the name of protein classifies it as a branch of the subset it belongs to.

Function 
The protein KIR2DL3 has long tailed cytoplasmic domain and transduce the inhibitory signal upon the ligand binding via an immunoreceptor tyrosine-based inhibitory motif (ITIM). The ligands of the protein is a subset of HLA-C molecules: HLA-Cw1, HLA-Cw3, HLA-Cw7. The protein is thought to play an important role in regulating of the immune responses. The HLA-C molecules are human leukocyte antigens and are the gene complexes to encode major histocompatibility complex (MHC) proteins in humans. HLA are polymorphic, thus the MHCs of humans differ from an individual to another. KIR2DL3 is a protein complex of two extracellular domains and a long tailed endo-cellular cytoplasmatic tail, which assign it in charge of sending inhibitory signals throughout the cell.

Pathology 
The protein KIR2DL3 transduces inhibitory signals upon the ligand binding via an immune tyrosine-based inhibitory motif (ITIM) to its long inner cytoplasmic tail. The tyrosine kinase based transductions are enzymatic transferences of a phosphate group from an ATP molecule to a protein in the cell. Thus functioning as an ' on ' and ' off ' switch in many cellular functions. Tyrosine Kinases are a sub-class of the protein-kinase. Phosphorylation of proteins is a necessary step in transduction of signals within a cell in order to regulate the cellular activity. Protein Kinases might get stuck in ' off ' position and inhibit the cell reproduction for good, or on the contrary might get stuck in ' on 'position, thus rendering the cell to reproduce unregulatedly, which is a necessary step for the development of cancer.

References 

Transmembrane receptors